Spodnje Partinje is a small settlement in the Slovene Hills in the Municipality of Lenart in northeastern Slovenia. The area is part of the traditional region of Styria and is now included in the Drava Statistical Region.

References

External links
Spodnje Partinje on Geopedia

Populated places in the Municipality of Lenart